Marcus Annaeus Lucanus (3 November 39 AD – 30 April 65 AD), better known in English as Lucan, was a Roman poet, born in Corduba (modern-day Córdoba), in Hispania Baetica. He is regarded as one of the outstanding figures of the Imperial Latin period, known in particular for his epic Pharsalia. His youth and speed of composition set him apart from other poets.

Life
Three brief ancient accounts allow for the reconstruction of a modest biography – the earliest attributed to Suetonius, another to an otherwise unknown Vacca, and the third anonymous and undated – along with references in Martial, Cassius Dio, Tacitus's Annals, and one of Statius's Silvae.  Lucan was the son of Marcus Annaeus Mela and grandson of Seneca the Elder; he grew up under the tutelage of his uncle Seneca the Younger.  Born into a wealthy family, he studied rhetoric at Athens and was probably provided with a philosophical and Stoic education by his uncle.
 His wife was Polla Argentaria, who is said to have assisted him with his Pharsalia.

He found success under Nero, became one of the emperor's close friends and was rewarded with a quaestorship in advance of the legal age. In 60 AD, he won a prize for extemporizing Orpheus and Laudes Neronis at the quinquennial Neronia, and was again rewarded when the emperor appointed him to the augurate. During this time he circulated the first three books of his epic poem Pharsalia (labelled De Bello civili in the manuscripts), which told the story of the civil war between Julius Caesar and Pompey.

At some point, a feud began between Nero and Lucan. Two very different accounts of the events have survived that both trivialize the feud. According to Tacitus, Nero became jealous of Lucan and forbade him to publish his poems. According to Suetonius, Nero disrupted a public reading by Lucan, by leaving and calling a meeting of the senate, and Lucan responded by writing insulting poems about Nero.

Other works, though, point to a more serious basis to the feud. Works by the grammarian Vacca and the poet Statius may support the claim that Lucan wrote insulting poems about Nero. Vacca mentions that one of Lucan's works was entitled De Incendio Urbis (On the Burning of the City). Statius's ode to Lucan mentions that Lucan described how the "unspeakable flames of the criminal tyrant roamed the heights of Remus." Additionally, the later books of Pharsalia are anti-Imperial and pro-Republic. This criticism of Nero and office of the Emperor may have been the true cause of the ban.

Lucan later joined the 65 AD conspiracy of Gaius Calpurnius Piso against Nero. The conspiracy was discovered and he was obliged, at the age of 25, to commit suicide by opening a vein, but not before incriminating his mother, among others, in the hopes of a pardon.  According to Tacitus, as Lucan bled to death, "(he) recalled some poetry he had composed in which he had told the story of a wounded soldier dying a similar kind of death and he recited the very lines. These were his last words."

His father was involved in the proscription but his mother escaped. Statius's poem about Lucan was addressed to his widow, Polla Argentaria, upon the occasion of his birthday during the reign of Domitian (Silvae, ii.7, the Genethliacon Lucani).

Works

According to Vacca and Statius, Lucan's works included:

Surviving work:
 Pharsalia or De Bello Civili (On the Civil War), on the wars between Julius Caesar and Pompey

Often attributed to him (but to others as well):
 Laus Pisonis (Praise of Piso), a panegyric of a member of the Piso family

Lost works:
 Catachthonion
 Iliacon from the Trojan cycle
 Epigrammata
 Adlocutio ad Pollam
 Silvae
 Saturnalia
 Medea
 Salticae Fabulae
 Laudes Neronis, a praise of Nero
 Orpheus
 Prosa oratio in Octavium Sagittam
 Epistulae ex Campania
 De Incendio Urbis, on the Roman fire of 64, perhaps accusing Nero of arson

Notes

References

Further reading
 Ahl, Frederick M.  Lucan:  An Introduction. Cornell Studies in Classical Philology 39.  Ithaca, New York: Cornell Univ. Pr., 1976.
 Bartsch, Shadi.  Ideology in Cold Blood:  A Reading of Lucan's Civil War.  Cambridge, Massachusetts:  Harvard Univ. Pr., 1997.
 Braund, Susanna M. (2008) Lucan: Civil War. Oxford World's Classics. Oxford University Press.
 Braund, Susanna M. (2009) A Lucan Reader: Selections from Civil War. BC Latin Readers. Bolchazy-Carducci.
 Dewar, Michael.  "Laying It On with a Trowel:  The Proem to Lucan and Related Texts."  Classical Quarterly 44 (1994), 199–211.
 Fantham, Elaine.  "Caesar and the Mutiny:  Lucan's Reshaping of the Historical Tradition in De Bello Civili 5.237–373." Classical Philology 80 (1985), 119–31.
 Fantham, Elaine (1992) De bello civili. Book II. Cambridge Greek and Latin Classics. Cambridge University Press.
 ———.  "Lucan's Medusa Excursus:  Its Design and Purpose." Materiali e discussioni 29 (1992), 95–119.
 Fratantuono, Lee.  "Madness Triumphant: A Reading of Lucan's Pharsalia."  Lanham, Maryland: Lexington Books, 2012.
 Henderson, John G. W.  "Lucan:  The Word at War." Ramus 16 (1987), 122–64.
 Johnson, Walter R.  Momentary Monsters:  Lucan and His Heroes. Cornell Studies in Classical Philology 47.  Ithaca, New York:  Cornell Univ. Pr., 1987.
 Lapidge, M.  "Lucan's Imagery of Cosmic Dissolution."  Hermes 107 (1979), 344–70.
 Leigh, Matthew.  Lucan:  Spectacle and Engagement.  New York:  Oxford Univ. Pr., 1997.
 Marti, Berthe.  "The Meaning of the Pharsalia."  American Journal of Philology 66 (1945), 352–76.
 Martindale, Charles A. "The Politician Lucan."  Greece and Rome 31 (1984), 64–79.
 Masters, Jamie.  Poetry and Civil War in Lucan's 'Bellum Civile'''. Cambridge Classical Studies.  New York:  Cambridge Univ. Pr., 1992.
 ———.  "Deceiving the Reader: The Political Mission of Lucan's Bellum Civile." Reflections of Nero:  Culture, History, and Representation, ed. Jás Elsner and Jamie Masters.  Chapel Hill:  Univ. of North Carolina Pr., 1994. 151–77.
 Matthews, Monica (2008) Caesar and the Storm: A Commentary on Lucan, De Bello Civili, Book 5, lines 476-721. Peter Lang.
 Morford, M. P. O.  The Poet Lucan.  New York:  Oxford Univ. Pr., 1967.
 O'Gorman, Ellen.  "Shifting Ground:  Lucan, Tacitus, and the Landscape of Civil War."  Hermathena 159 (1995), 117–31.
 Rossi, Andreola.  "Remapping the Past: Caesar's Tale of Troy (Lucan BC 9.964–999)."  Phoenix 55 (2001), 313–26.
 Sklenar, Robert John. The Taste for Nothingness:  A Study of "Virtus" and Related Themes in Lucan's Bellum Civile.  Ann Arbor:  Univ. of Mich. Pr., 2003.
 Thomas, Richard F.  "The Stoic Landscape of Lucan 9." Lands and Peoples in Roman Poetry:  The Ethnographic Tradition. New York:  Cambridge Univ. Pr., 1982. 108–23.
 Wick, Claudia (2004) Marcus Annaeus Lucanus, Bellum Civile, liber IX. I: Einleitung, Text und Übersetzung; II: Kommentar. K.G. Saur.
 Wilson Joyce, Jane (1994) Lucan: Pharsalia''. Cornell University Press.

External links

 
 
 
 Marcus Annaeus Lucanus:  text, concordances and frequency list
 Text of Lucan at the Latin Library

39 births
65 deaths
People from Córdoba, Spain
1st-century Romans
Silver Age Latin writers
Ancient Roman poets
Epic poets
Suicides by sharp instrument in Italy
Forced suicides
Romans from Hispania
Annaei
1st-century Roman poets
Members of the Pisonian conspiracy
Ancient Romans who committed suicide